Chicoreus saulii is a species of sea snail, a marine gastropod mollusk in the family Muricidae, the murex snails or rock snails.

Description
The shell size varies between 60 mm and 142 mm.

Distribution
This species is distributed in the Indian Ocean along the Mascarene Basin; in the Pacific Ocean along Japan and Papua New Guinea

References

 rivas, J. & M. Jay (1988). Coquillages de La Réunion et de l'île Maurice

External links

 

Chicoreus
Gastropods described in 1841